

Badenoth (or Badunoth) was a medieval Bishop of Rochester. He was consecrated between 845 and 868 and died between 845 and 868.

Citations

References

External links
 

Bishops of Rochester
9th-century English bishops